SL Green Realty Corp. is a real estate investment trust that primarily invests in office buildings and shopping centers in New York City. As of December 31, 2019, the company owned 43 properties comprising 14,438,964 square feet. 

Notable properties owned by the company are One Astor Plaza, One Vanderbilt, 461 Fifth Avenue, 810 Seventh Avenue, 919 Third Avenue, the Pershing Square Building, and Random House Tower.

History
The company's predecessor, S.L. Green Properties, Inc., was formed in 1980 by Stephen L. Green.

In 1997, the company was formed as a successor.

In 2000, the company sold the Whitehall Building.

In 2002, in partnership with SITQ, the company acquired One Astor Plaza for $483.5 million.

In 2003, the company acquired 461 Fifth Avenue for $100.3 million.

In November 2004, the company sold The Knickerbocker Hotel (Manhattan) for $160 million.

In 2005, the company acquired the Metropolitan Life Insurance Company Tower for $916 million and converted the building into condominiums.

In 2006, the company acquired Reckson Associates in a $4 billion transaction.

In December 2007, the company acquired 388 Greenwich Street from Citigroup in a leaseback transaction. Citigroup reacquired the building in 2016.

In 2010, the company acquired the Pershing Square Building from Shorenstein Properties for $330 million.

In 2011, the company sold One Court Square in Long Island City, Queens to David Werner and Joel Schreiber for $481 million

In August 2017, the company sold the Montague-Court Building for $171.0 million. The company had bought the property for $107.5 million in 2007 and made significant upgrades.

In November 2018, the company purchased a $148 million stake in 245 Park Avenue from Chinese conglomerate HNA Group. The company was also appointed as property manager and leasing manager.

Buildings
Buildings under management of SL Green Realty:

One Vanderbilt
One Astor Plaza
100 Park Avenue
110 East 42nd Street
461 Fifth Avenue
810 Seventh Avenue
919 Third Avenue
Graybar Building
The News Building
Pershing Square Building
Random House Tower
Worldwide Plaza

References

External links
Official Website
Property Management

1997 initial public offerings
Publicly traded companies based in New York City
Companies listed on the New York Stock Exchange
Property management companies
Real estate companies established in 1980
Real estate investment trusts of the United States